Zdeněk Mácal (born 8 January 1936) is a Czech conductor.

Mácal was born in Brno, Czechoslovakia, and began violin lessons with his father at the age of four. He later attended the Brno Conservatory and the Janáček Academy of Music and Performing Arts, where he graduated in 1960 with top honors. He became the principal conductor of the Prague Symphony Orchestra and conducted both symphonic concerts and operas. He won the 1965 International Conducting Competition in Besançon, France, and the 1966 Dimitri Mitropoulos International Music Competition in New York, under the direction of Leonard Bernstein. Leaving behind a promising career in Czechoslovakia, he left the country after the Soviet-led invasion of 1968 crushed the Prague Spring, finding work first at the WDR Symphony Orchestra Cologne, followed by the Radio Orchestra of Hanover. He made an impressive London debut in February 1969 when he led the Bournemouth Symphony Orchestra, as a last minute replacement for Constantin Silvestri, in a dazzling performance at the Royal Festival Hall, London of Richard Strauss's Don Quixote, with cello soloist Paul Tortelier and viola Mary Samuel, providing the role of Sancho Panza.

Mácal made his American debut with the Chicago Symphony Orchestra in 1972. He served as Artistic Advisor of the San Antonio Symphony and principal conductor of Chicago's Grant Park Music Festival.

Mácal was appointed Chief Conductor of the Sydney Symphony Orchestra for a three-year contract, beginning with the 1986 season. The Australian Broadcasting Corporation had agreed at the outset to adjust Mácal's fee so that he would not be adversely affected by the fluctuating Australian dollar, or in his tax arrangements, and any loss would be borne by the ABC. Shortly after taking up his appointment in March 1986, he asked to be released from his contract from the end of the first year, and this was agreed to. But in July 1986, with five concerts of his first season still to come, he left the country without explanation or even informing the ABC.

Mácal became music director of the Milwaukee Symphony Orchestra in 1986. He took that orchestra on a critically acclaimed East Coast tour in 1989, which included performances at the Kennedy Center in Washington, D.C. and Carnegie Hall in New York. He made a very popular recording of Má vlast by Bedřich Smetana for Telarc Records in 1991. During his tenure in Milwaukee, the orchestra's concerts were broadcast on more than 300 radio stations.

Mácal left Milwaukee to become Music Director of the New Jersey Symphony Orchestra (NJSO) in September 1993. Delos International recorded Antonín Dvořák's Stabat Mater in the fall of 1994. In 1995, he made Dolby Surround recordings of the Symphony No. 2 in C minor and the suite from the ballet The Red Poppy by Reinhold Glière. He concluded his NJSO tenure in 2002 and took on an emeritus title with the orchestra subsequently.

In 2003, Mácal was appointed chief conductor of the Czech Philharmonic. His contract with the orchestra was through 2008, but he suddenly resigned in September 2007.

In 1977, Mácal made his own orchestral arrangement of Modest Mussorgsky's piano suite Pictures at an Exhibition. Note to Edward Johnson - "I have never written a note or orchestration of my own"—Zdenek Mácal 20 April 1996.  Incorrectly listed in John Holmes's "Conductors on Record." In 2006, Mácal made a brief appearance in the Japanese drama series Nodame Cantabile, based on the manga by Tomoko Ninomiya, during scenes shot in Prague. He played the main character's childhood mentor, conductor Sebastiano Vieira, a role he recently returned to for the two special episodes filmed in 2007 and broadcast on 4 and 5 January 2008.

References

External links

Interview with Zdeněk Mácal, 26 July 1990

1936 births
Living people
Czech conductors (music)
Male conductors (music)
Recipients of Medal of Merit (Czech Republic)
21st-century conductors (music)
21st-century Czech male musicians
Brno Conservatory alumni